The 2010 Pan American Aerobic Gymnastics Championships were held in Balneário Camboriú, Brazil, November 18–21, 2010. The competition was organized by the Brazilian Gymnastics Federation, and approved by the International Gymnastics Federation.

Medalists

References

Pan American Aerobic Gymnastics Championships
International gymnastics competitions hosted by Brazil
Pan American Aerobic Gymnastics Championships
Pan American Aerobic Gymnastics Championships
Pan American Gymnastics Championships